Nick Palumbo (born November 12, 1970) is an American film director, screenwriter and producer.

Films
Palumbo's film Murder-Set-Pieces was released to theatres on December 24, 2004. The film was submitted for release in the United Kingdom to the British Board of Film Classification (BBFC) who refused to give the film an '18' certificate, therefore making the film illegal to supply within the UK. The BBFC stated they rejected the film because of sexual violence, and the film was potentially breaking UK obscenity laws. Rotten Tomatoes reported that 36% of 11 reviews for the film were positive, with an average rating of 3.7/10. On Metacritic, the film has a 13 out of 100 rating, based on 5 critics, signifying "overwhelming dislike".

In 2016, independent film label Massacre Video re-released Palumbo's first feature, Nutbag, uncut and with all new artwork.

He had a feature on My 600-lb Life Back in 2014 And has now lost a bunch of weight, this was one of his first features for film.

Filmography
Nutbag (2000 serial killer film set in Las Vegas)
Murder-Set-Pieces (2004)

References

External links

1970 births
Living people
American film directors
Horror film directors
English-language film directors
American film producers
American screenwriters